Life and the Land was a Canadian informational television series on gardening and agriculture which aired on CBC Television in 1966.

Premise
This series, previously produced as Countrytime, featured stories of national and regional scope. Each episode was structured in two parts. The first part contained general agriculture-related items which was produced at various CBC production centres across Canada and which aired nationally. The second part focused on local gardening, produced and broadcast within each region.

Regular experts included Earl Cox (Ontario, Quebec), Bernard Moore (Pacific/British Columbia), Gordon Warren (Atlantic) and Stan Westway (Prairies).

Scheduling
This half-hour series was broadcast on Saturdays at 6:00 p.m. (Eastern) from 2 April to 31 December 1966.

References

External links
 

1966 Canadian television series debuts
1966 Canadian television series endings
Agriculture in Canada
CBC Television original programming
Gardening television